The Greenville Country Club, formerly known as the Owl's Nest Country Place, is a country club at 201 Owl's Nest Road in Greenville, Delaware.  The  property was developed in 1915 by Eugene du Pont, Jr., son of Eugene du Pont, as a country estate.  It was one of the first major estates to be built by members of the Du Pont family in northern Delaware.  The main house and three outbuildings were designed by Harrie T. Lindeberg in the Tudor Revival style, and were built in 1915.  The estate's grounds were landscaped by Franklin Meehan and William Warner Parker.  In 1928 an Ellen Shipman-designed boxwood garden was added to the grounds.  The estate has been home to the Greenville Country Club since 1961.

The property was listed on the National Register of Historic Places in 2010.

See also
National Register of Historic Places listings in northern New Castle County, Delaware

References

Houses on the National Register of Historic Places in Delaware
Tudor Revival architecture in Delaware
Houses completed in 1915
Houses in New Castle County, Delaware
Golf clubs and courses in Delaware
Du Pont family residences
National Register of Historic Places in New Castle County, Delaware